Muhammad Kasim (born 1886) was an elementary school teacher and writer in the Dutch East Indies who published several books. His short story collection Teman Doedoek is considered the first short story collection in the Indonesian literary canon.

Biography 
Kasim was born in Muara Sipongi, North Sumatra, in 1886.

Bibliography 
 Pemandangan dalam Dunia Kanak-Kanak (1928, children's story)
 Muda Teruna (1922, novel)
 "Bertengkar dan Berbisik" (short story)
 "Bual di Kedai Kopi" (short story)
 "Ja Binuang Pergi Berburu" (short story)
 Niki Bahtera (1920, translation of children's story by C.J. Kieviet)
 Pangeran Hindi (1931, translation of children's story)
 Teman Doedoek (1936, short story collection)

References

1886 births
Writers from the Dutch East Indies
People from North Sumatra
Year of death missing
Place of death missing